Annan shogi also called Korean shogi, is a variant of shogi (Japanese chess).  Annan shogi is a popular shogi variant in Japan.

Gameplay 
The game is played as standard shogi, except that, when a piece has a friendly piece on the square directly behind it, it has the movement of that piece instead of its own.  A variant rule is that a piece may move like any friendly piece that protects it. The setup is somewhat different from standard shogi.

The game should not be confused with Korean chess, a variant of chess that is played in Korea, but which resembles xiangqi (Chinese chess) rather than shogi.

Setup

See also 
 Shogi variant
 Whale shogi
 Hasami shogi
 Unashogi
 Ko shogi
 Knight relay chess

External links 
 The rules of Annan Shogi

Shogi variants